Crepis nicaeensis is a European species of flowering plant in the family Asteraceae with the common names French hawk's-beard and Turkish hawksbeard. It is widespread across much of Europe, as well as being sparingly naturalized in scattered locations in the United States and Canada.

Crepis nicaeensis  is an annual or biennial herb up to 110 cm (44 inches) tall. One plant can produce as many as 15 flower heads, each with as many as 60 yellow ray florets but no disc florets.

References

External links
 Altervista Flora Italiana, Radicchiella di Nizza, French Hawk's Beard, Turkish Hawksbeard, Crepis nicaeensis Pers.
 
 Tele Botanica in French with photos and French distribution map
 photo of herbarium specimen at Missouri Botanical Garden

nicaeensis
Flora of Europe
Plants described in 1807